The 2018 Alaska House of Representatives election were held on Tuesday, November 6, 2018, with the primary election on August 21, 2018. Voters in the 40 districts of the Alaska House of Representatives elected their representatives. The elections coincided with the elections for other state offices, including the gubernatorial election and the state senate elections. While Republicans nominally gained a majority in the chamber, when the new House convened in 2019, Democratic members formed a coalition with Independents and dissident Republicans to re-elect Bryce Edgmon as Speaker.

Overview

Results

District 1 

After originally being tied, a recount was ordered, which put LeBon ahead by only one vote. On December 5, Dodge appealed the result to the Alaska Supreme Court. However on January 4, the court denied Dodge's appeal, officially making LeBon the winner.

District 2

District 3

District 4

District 5

District 6

District 7

District 8

District 9

District 10

District 11

District 12

District 13

On December 5, Governor Mike Dunleavy named Dahlstrom the new Commissioner of the Alaska Department of Corrections. 15 days later, Dunleavy appointed former Lt. Governor candidate Sharon Jackson to fill Dahlstrom's seat.

District 14

District 15

District 16

District 17

District 18

District 19

District 20

District 21

District 22

District 23

District 24

District 25

District 26

District 27

District 28

District 29

District 30

District 31

District 32

District 33

District 34

District 35

District 36

District 37

District 38

District 39

District 40

See also
 2018 Alaska State Senate election

Notes

References

2018 Alaska elections
2018
Alaska House